Oregon Route 228 is an Oregon state highway that runs between the city of Halsey in the Willamette Valley and the city of Sweet Home in the Cascade foothills. It lies entirely within Linn County.

Route description
Oregon Route 228 begins at its junction with Oregon Route 99E in Halsey. The highway continues to the east, ending at an intersection with U.S. Route 20 in Sweet Home.

Major intersections

Gallery

References

228
Transportation in Linn County, Oregon
Sweet Home, Oregon
Brownsville, Oregon